Ōkagami is a Japanese historical tale written in around 1119 by an unknown author. It covers the period 850 to 1025, the golden days of the Fujiwara family's rule. It is said to be a successor (世継物語, yotsugi monogatari) with the records of the Eiga Monogatari.

In the tale, the writer listens to a conversation mainly led by a 190-year-old man, Ōyake no Yotsugi (大宅世継, literally "world-successor"), who recalls the past. A 180-year-old man, Natsuyama no Shigeki (夏山繁樹), adds comments and a young samurai puts questions to these two elders. This narrative strategy makes the story vivid and allows for the natural addition of various opinions and criticisms.

The structure is modelled after traditional Chinese history books like the Records of the Grand Historian. It consists of Preface, Stories of Emperors, Stories of Ministers, Miscellaneous Stories and Post-fin.

This and three other tales with mirror (鏡 kagami, also read kyō) in their titles are collectively called four mirrors (四鏡 shikyō).

Translations 
There are two translations into English:
 The Ōkagami: A Japanese Historical Tale, translated by Joseph K. Yamagiwa, with a foreword by Edwin O. Reischauer, London: Allen & Unwin, 1967. 488 pp. Reprint Tuttle 1997
 Ōkagami: The Great Mirror: Fujiwara Michinaga (966-1027) and His Times - A Study and Translation, by  Helen Craig McCullough, Princeton, NJ: Princeton University Press, 1980. .

See also
 Japanese Historical Text Initiative
 Imakagami
 Mizukagami
 Masukagami
 Azuma Kagami

References

External links
J－Texts (日本文学電子図書館) Online texts of the mirror books
Manuscript scans at Waseda University Library: 6 volumes (unknown date), 1891 (8 volumes, Kume Motobume)

Late Old Japanese texts
Heian period in literature
Monogatari
12th-century Japanese books
History books of the Heian Period